Santa María Ixcatlan is a town and municipality in Oaxaca in south-western Mexico. 
It is part of the Teotitlán District in the north of the Cañada Region.

Geography
The municipality has an area of 201.58 km2 at an elevation of 1,840 meters above sea level.
In the settled areas the climate is hot and humid with abundant rainfall in summer.
Other areas are arid with little rainfall.
Trees include morillo, oak and juniper, and fruit-bearing peach, apricot, pomegranates, figs and hawthorn.  
Local birds include chachalaca, quail, dove, sparrow, goldfinch, orioles, hawks and eagles. 
Wild life includes coyote, fox, wild cat, wild boar, badger, rattlesnake, coral snake, lizards and scorpions.

Demographics
As of 2005, the municipality had a total population of 573 of whom 37 people spoke an indigenous language.
The town is the only one inhabited by speakers of the Ixcatec language.  
According to the Consejo Nacional para la Cultura y las Artes, there were only 8 speakers of the Ixcateco (Xwja) language in 2008.
Most of the population is engaged in cultivation of maize, beans, wheat and barley, and also in manufacture of artisan products made from palms. There is small-scale animal husbandry of goat, cattle, horses and donkeys.

Economy
Mezcal is produced in the village.

References

Municipalities of Oaxaca